Range Software is finite element analysis software package.

Analysis types 

 Steady-state and transient heat transfer + thermal radiation
 Stress analysis
 Soft body dynamics
 Modal analysis
 Computational fluid dynamics + heat transfer, contaminant dispersion
 Electrostatics
 Magnetostatics
 Coupled multiphysics
 Shape optimization

External links 
 

Computer-aided engineering software
Engineering software companies
Finite element software
Numerical software
Science software
Scientific simulation software
Simulation software
Finite element software for Linux